Lucien Boyer, (1876-1942) was a French music hall singer.  He first won popularity singing to soldiers at the front during World War I.

Boyer's fame as a writer and singer spread throughout the world from the Montmartre district of Paris.  He was author of more than 1,000 songs and 39 musical comedies and operettas.  Among his best known songs were Valencia, Cu C'est Paris, La Femme du Matelot and Mon Paris.  

When he came to America in 1921, it was for the purpose of acquiring American songs to be adapted for the public in France that liked "le Jazz."  

Though Boyer did not author the famous French song La Madelon, he popularized the song during World War I.

Published works

 Lucien Boyer  Le Gondolier de Montmartre, collection of poetry, Paris, éditions du vieux moulin, 1926
 Lucien Boyer Paysages de France, Paris, société des publications modernes, 1931
 Lucien Boyer Qu'il était beau mon village, novel, Paris, éditions Baudinière, 1935

References 
 Léon de Bercy, Montmartre et ses chansons : Poètes et Chansonniers (with 5 portraits-charges by C. Léandre), H. Daragon, Paris, 1902, 280 p. En ligne sur Gallica
 1920 : Chez Mayol (Concert Mayol). Berlingot : operetta in 2 acts and 3 tableaux by Lucien Boyer, music by Willy Redstone and A. Stanislas : Poster illustrated by Adrien Barrère (1877-1931) En ligne sur Gallica
 Chantal Brunschwig, Louis-Jean Calvet, Jean-Claude Klein, Cent ans de chanson française, Seuil, 1972 (1re éd. reliée) ; ré-éd. poche (coll. Points actuels), 1981

External links
  Le voyage autour du monde de Lucien Boyer et Numa Blès vu par Paris qui chante  (personal site of Hervé David)

People from Gironde
1876 births
1942 deaths
French chansonniers
French librettists
20th-century French poets
Chevaliers of the Légion d'honneur
Burials at Batignolles Cemetery